Jérémy Sorbon (born 5 August 1983) is a French former professional footballer who played as a defender.

Career
Born in Caen, Sorbon spent large parts of his career at Stade Malherbe Caen, playing almost 300 games.

In June 2013, with his contract expiring, he signed for the Breton club En Avant de Guingamp. Few weeks before, Guingamp finished the season 2012–13 one place over Caen and was promoted to the Ligue 1.

During his career, Sorbon appeared in two Coupe de la Ligue finals (once in 2004–05 with Caen and once in 2018–19 with Guingamp).

Honours
Guingamp
 Coupe de France: 2013–14

References

External links
 
 
 

1983 births
Living people
Footballers from Caen
Association football defenders
French footballers
French people of Guadeloupean descent
Stade Malherbe Caen players
En Avant Guingamp players
Ligue 1 players
Ligue 2 players